Contulmo (Mapudungun: "place of transit") is a Chilean town and commune in Arauco Province, Biobío Region. Colonized by Germans of Berlin since 1884.

Geography
Contulmo spans an area of   It is bordered by the commune of Cañete to the north and northwest, Tirúa to the southwest, Purén to the east and Lumaco to the southeast.

The commune includes part of the lakes Lanalhue and Lleulleu. The town of Contulmo is surrounded by mountains and hills of the Nahuelbuta Range.

Demographics
According to the 2002 census of the National Statistics Institute, Contulmo has 5,838 inhabitants (3,020 men and 2,818 women). Of these, 2,442 (41.8%) lived in urban areas and 3,396 (58.2%) in rural areas. The population fell by 13.3% (898 persons) between the 1992 and 2002 censuses.

Culture
Main articles: German Chileans and German colonization of Valdivia, Osorno and Llanquihue

In architecture and urban design the town shows the German colonization. Every year in April is celebrated the "Fest der Kolonisten" which means "feast of the colonists" in German, and in December is the "Feast of the White Strawberry", among other festivities.

Administration

As a commune, Contulmo is a third-level administrative division of Chile administered by a municipal council, headed by an alcalde who is directly elected every four years. The 2016-2020 alcalde is Mauricio Lebrecht Sperberg (UDI).

Within the electoral divisions of Chile, Contulmo is represented in the Chamber of Deputies by Manuel Monsalve (PS) and Iván Norambuena (UDI) as part of the 46th electoral district, together with Lota, Lebu, Arauco, Curanilahue, Los Álamos, Cañete and Tirúa. The commune is represented in the Senate by Victor Pérez Varela (UDI) and Mariano Ruiz-Esquide Jara (PDC) as part of the 13th senatorial constituency (Biobío-Coast).

References

External links
  Municipality of Contulmo

Communes of Chile
Populated places in Arauco Province
Populated places established in 1884
1884 establishments in Chile